Lingshou County is a county of Hebei Province, North China, it is under the administration of the prefecture-level city of Shijiazhuang, the capital of the province. Lingshou town is located in the southeastern portion of Lingshou County. The location of Lingshou town is approximately 38.309646 N, 114.382275 E.

Administrative divisions
Towns:
Lingshou Town, 
Qingtong, 
Tashang, 
Ciyu, 
Chatou, 
Chenzhuang

Townships:
Sanshengyuan Township, 
Beiwa Township, 
Niucheng Township, 
Goutai Township, 
Nanzhai Township, 
Beitanzhuang Township, 
Zhaitou Township, 
Nanying Township, 
Nanyanchuan Township

Climate

Recreational Areas 

The Hengshanling Reservoir (横山岭水库) is located in central Lingshou County, nearby Wangjiagou Village. The Hengshan Scenic Area sits on the border of Hengshanlin.

References

County-level divisions of Hebei
Shijiazhuang